Imaginations from the Other Side is the fifth studio album by the German power metal band Blind Guardian, released in 1995. The atmosphere of this album is darker in comparison to their earlier works, such as Battalions of Fear, which had a relatively light tone. This album also marks the first since Battalions of Fear which Kai Hansen (Helloween, Gamma Ray) did not contribute guest vocals or guitar, and the last album to feature vocalist Hansi Kürsch as bassist. It was also their first album to spawn singles, namely "A Past and Future Secret" and "Bright Eyes". It was remastered and re-released on 15 June 2007, with bonus tracks and videos.

Background and recording 
Having experienced much success from their previous releases, Somewhere Far Beyond and Tokyo Tales (their first live album), the band was optimistic as they began writing for a new album once again. They soon noted how slow the process was advancing in comparison to previous writing sessions. For these new songs, personal standards were raised for which parts should make the cut, and ideas that weren't satisfactory were therefore scrapped. However, after the first two songs, "Imaginations from the Other Side" and "The Script for my Requiem", were demoed, the bandmembers were pleased by their exceptional quality, and once the next two songs, "I'm Alive" and "A Past and Future Secret", were written and added to the demo tape, they were confident in moving forward. Having not been satisfied with the production on their last two releases, Somewhere Far Beyond and Tokyo Tales (both produced by Kalle Trapp), Kürsch and Olbrich soon began searching for a new producer whilst traveling around Europe.

At their first stop, Denmark, they met producer Flemming Rasmussen, who had previously worked with bands Rainbow, Pretty Maids, and Metallica (a predominant influence on the band's style). After visiting other studios throughout the summer, even ones in which albums of the Beatles and the Rolling Stones were recorded, the two felt that Rasmussen, who had been noticeably impressed by the demo tape, was the obvious choice. Despite him expecting more out of the band than they were previously accustomed to with Trapp (specifically in rhythm guitar and vocal performances), there was a noticeable chemistry between Rasmussen and the band. Rhythm guitarist Marcus Siepen would later reflect that he "took [them] to a completely different level, in any aspect."

Musical style 
Following the footsteps of the band's previous albums, Imaginations continued to stray from purely speed metal tendencies. In addition to fast guitar riffing, high-pitch distorted singing and extreme drumming (signature of speed metal) came catchy chord progressions and clean singing - components reminiscent of classic European folk music. Two tracks, "A Past and Future Secret" and "Mordred's Song" (comparable to their previous album's "The Bard's Song (In the Forest)" by similar use of acoustic guitar), could even be considered to be a "ballad" and "power ballad", respectively.

Critical reception

In 2005, Imaginations from the Other Side was ranked number 373 in Rock Hard magazine's book of The 500 Greatest Rock & Metal Albums of All Time.

Loudwire named the album at second in their list "Top 25 Power Metal Albums of All Time" and Metal Hammer ranked it at third in a similar list.

Track listing 
All songs written by Hansi Kürsch and André Olbrich, except for where noted.

Lyrical references 

 "Imaginations from the Other Side" contains references to The Wizard of Oz, Peter Pan, The Lord of the Rings, Alice in Wonderland, The Sword in the Stone, The Never-Ending Story, Chronicles of Narnia and the Corum novels.
 "I'm Alive" is about "The Sunset Warrior" by "Eric Van Lustbader".
 "A Past and Future Secret" is about T.H. White's The Once and Future King.
 "Mordred's Song" is about the character Mordred from Arthurian Legend.
 "Bright Eyes", according to an interview with Hansi, is loosely connected to the second part of the book The Neverending Story by Michael Ende.

Personnel 
 Hansi Kürsch – vocals and bass
 André Olbrich – lead, rhythm and acoustic guitars
 Marcus Siepen – rhythm guitar
 Thomen Stauch – drums and percussion

Guest musicians
 Mathias Wiesner – effects
 Jacob Moth – acoustic guitar  on "A Past and Future Secret"
 Billy King, "Hacky" Hackmann, Rolf Köhler, Piet Sielck, Ronnie Atkins – backing vocals

Production
 Andreas Marschall – cover paintings
 Ulf Thürmann – photos
 Flemming Rasmussen – producing and mixing
 Flemming Rasmussen and Piet Sielck – engineering
 Henrik Vindeby – assistant engineer
 Flemming Rasmussen and Cuni – drum tech

References 

1995 albums
Blind Guardian albums
Song cycles
Albums produced by Flemming Rasmussen
Virgin Records albums